The Servant Question is a 1920 American silent comedy mystery film directed by Dell Henderson and starring William Collier Sr., Virginia Lee, and William Collier Jr.

Cast
 William Collier Sr. as Mr. Butler 
 Virginia Lee as Muriel Merrick 
 William Collier Jr. as Jack Merrick
 Armand Cortes as Count Amboy 
 Rapley Holmes as Mr. Merrick

References

Bibliography
 James Robert Parish & Michael R. Pitts. Film directors: a guide to their American films. Scarecrow Press, 1974.

External links

1920 films
1920 comedy films
Silent American comedy films
Films directed by Dell Henderson
American silent feature films
1920s English-language films
American black-and-white films
Selznick Pictures films
1920s American films
Silent mystery films
American mystery comedy-drama films